"For You" is a song by the English rock band the Outfield. It was the lead single from their fourth studio album, Diamond Days (1990), released on MCA Records. The single was released in 1990. In the U.S., the song hit number 13 on the Billboard Album Rock Tracks chart and number 21 on the Billboard Hot 100. It was the best-performing single from Diamond Days, as well as the group's last top 40 hit.

Charts

Weekly charts

Year-end charts

References

External links 

1990 songs
1990 singles
The Outfield songs
MCA Records singles
Songs written by John Spinks (musician)